Kanaka may refer to:
 Kanak people, the indigenous Melanesian residents of New Caledonia 
 kanaka maoli, traditional name native of the Hawaiian people

 Kanaka (Pacific Island worker), workers from Pacific Islands employed in British colonies and in North American fur trade and goldfields
 Kanaka Bar, British Columbia, an unincorporated area in the Fraser Canyon of British Columbia
 Kanaka Bar First Nation, the Nlaka'pamux First Nations government at the Kanaka Bar, British Columbia
 Kanaka Creek, British Columbia, a historical settlement and modern neighbourhood in the District of Maple Ridge, British Columbia, Canada
 Kanaka Creek Regional Park, a regional park run by the Greater Vancouver Regional District, in Maple Ridge, British Columbia, Canada
 Kanaka (given name), an Indian name (including a list of persons with the name)
 Kanaka (actress), Indian film actress
 Kanaka, the Sanskrit term for a species of Datura
 Kanaka (film), a 2018 Indian Kannada romantic action film

See also
 Kanaka Shree, an award instituted by the government of Karnataka, India
 Kanaka pigeon, an extinct bird of New Caledonia and Tonga
 Native Hawaiians or kānaka ʻōiwi
 Kanake, racial epithet in the German language, derived from the Melanesian term
 Tāngata whenua, a Māori term of the indigenous peoples of New Zealand and literally means "people of the land", from tāngata ("people") and whenua ("land")
 Tangata manu
 Owyhee (disambiguation)